The International Association for Life-Cycle Civil Engineering (or IALCCE) is an international organization founded in October 2006. Its declared mission is "to become the premier international organization for the advancement of the state-of-the-art in the field of life-cycle civil engineering".

Activities

IALCCE has organized its First International Symposium in 2008 in Varenna, Lake Como, Italy (IALCCE'08 ), and the Second International Symposium in
2010 in Taipei, Taiwan (IALCCE2010 ). The Third International Symposium
will be held in 2012 in Vienna, Austria (IALCCE2012 ).

Moreover, IALCCE has sponsored several events organized by other associations.

Publications

The proceedings of the First International Symposium on Life-Cycle Civil Engineering (IALCCE’08) were published by CRC Press, Taylor & Francis Group, as a set comprising a hardbound book of full papers and a CD-ROM. The proceedings of the Second International Symposium on Life-Cycle Civil Engineering (IALCCE2010) were published by Taiwan University of Science & Technology (Taiwan Tech) as a set comprising a hardbound book of abstracts and a CD-ROM of full papers.

Extended versions of selected papers included in the proceedings of IALCCE'08 were published in a Special Issue of the international peer-reviewed journal Structure and Infrastructure Engineering (Taylor & Francis).

Notes

External links
 Home Page
 IALCCE 2008
 IALCCE 2010
 IALCCE 2012

Civil engineering organizations
Engineering societies